Mszadla  is a village in the administrative district of Gmina Lipce Reymontowskie, within Skierniewice County, Łódź Voivodeship, in central Poland.

Massacre during Second World War
During the German invasion of Poland at the start of World War II, German forces on 10 September 1939 murdered 153 Poles in the village (see Nazi crimes against the Polish nation). The victims were local farmers, refugees, four children as young as three years old.

References

Villages in Skierniewice County
Massacres in Poland
Massacres of Poles
Nazi war crimes in Poland